The 2021–22 Utah Valley Wolverines women's basketball team represented Utah Valley University in the 2021–22 NCAA Division I women's basketball season. Dan Nielson entered the season as head coach for his 3rd season. The Wolverines played their home games at the UCCU Center and Lockhart Arena in Orem, Utah as members of the Western Athletic Conference (WAC).

Previous season 
The Wolverines finished the 2020–21 season 13–7, 10–4 in WAC play to finish in second place. In the 2021 WAC women's basketball tournament, they defeated Chicago State in the quarterfinals before losing to Grand Canyon in the semifinals. Still, UVU received the WAC's automatic bid to the 2021 NCAA Division I women's basketball tournament as a No. 16 seed since California Baptist was ineligible due to their transition to Division I. UVU lost to No. 1 seed and eventual champion Stanford 87–44 in the opening round of the NCAA tournament.

Roster

Schedule and results

|-
!colspan=12 style=| Non-Conference season

|-
!colspan=12 style=| WAC conference season

|-
!colspan=9 style=|WAC Tournament

See also
 2021–22 Utah Valley Wolverines men's basketball team

References

Utah Valley Wolverines women's basketball seasons
Utah Valley
Utah Valley Wolverines women's basketball
Utah Valley Wolverines women's basketball